Dustin Tatro  is an American musician who is the stadium organist for Major League Baseball's Texas Rangers.

Tatro serves as organist and choirmaster at St. Andrew's Anglican Church in Breckenridge, Texas, and is also a 20-year radio personality currently serving as OM/PD and chief engineer for WesTex Communications in Abilene, hosting middays on 101.7 The Raider. Formerly, Tatro hosted middays for Q Country 96.1 (KORQ) and a late-night rock program on KGNZ. He was also the creator and host of a globally-syndicated weekly radio show called The RockDown Show with Dustin Tatro , which features artist interviews and counts down the top ten songs in Christian Rock. He also holds certification as a Texas EMT. 

Tatro began working for the Rangers in early 2020, right before the COVID-19 pandemic. He is the first official organist of the Rangers since Marcia Rogers left in 2001 after playing since the opening of Globe Life Park in Arlington in 1994. He got the job when Chuck Morgan, Executive Vice President for Ballpark Entertainment, saw videos Tatro had posted on social media while rehearsing for a major pipe organ recital and reached out to invite him to become organist for the Rangers.

Beginning with the 2020 Major League Baseball season, the Texas Rangers began playing at Globe Life Field, which, as of September 2021, does not have an organ installed.  For the 2020 season, Tatro recorded approximately 750 pieces of organ music on a refurbished 1951 Hammond C2 organ that he acquired from the storage of a local Baptist church. He also recorded some songs on the 2,800-pipe Garland organ at St. Paul UMC Abilene, where he has been the organist since 2014.  Like many other stadium organists, Tatro takes requests on social media.

Personal life
Tatro is from Andrews, Texas and has lived in Abilene since 2009. He holds undergraduate and masters degrees in church music, with organ and choral conducting emphases, from Hardin-Simmons University. He is married to Staci Armstrong.

External links
 Official website

References

Living people
American organists
Stadium organists
21st-century organists
American male organists
21st-century American keyboardists
21st-century American male musicians
Year of birth missing (living people)